India Ke Mast Kalandar is an Indian television reality show which features the talents of people from all over India.  It is hosted by Rajiv Thakur and Karan Wahi with Mika Singh and Geeta Kapoor as the two judges. The show ran from July to October 2018 . The winner of the show was Rahul Kumar.

Cast

Judges
 Geeta Kapoor
 Mika Singh

Hosts
 Rajiv Thakur
 Karan Wahi
 Sumeet Raghvan

Guests
 Baldev to promote Comedy Circus

Season overview

Auditions
The selected contestants throughout the India via Sony Liv app, have to pass the auditions to go for next level . The auditions took place for 9 weeks from which the contestants were chosen. Each selected contestant was given up a medal as   a reward for being selected for the next level (i.e.Aar Ya Paar Ki Takkar).

Aar Ya Paar Ki Takkar
The contestants selected from the auditions have to do a face-off round known as Aar Ya Paar Ki Takkar. It included the face off between/among two or more constant(s). Then only one was chosen between them for the next round (i.e.Semi Finals )

Semi-finals
The top performerers from each episode were getting place in the Grand Finale.

Grand Finale
The grand finale of India Ke Mast Kalandar was held on 14 October 2018. The chief guest for this grand event was Badshah. The winner of India Ke Mast Kalandar was Rahul Kumar and runners up were The Dazzlers, Ved, Raja Aadam, Sameer, Vikram & Shrusthi, John & Azim, Filmy Kawwals.

References

Indian reality television series
2018 Indian television series debuts
Television series by Optimystix Entertainment
Sony SAB original programming
Indian game shows